Vitali Kurkudym (born 1 November 1977) is a Ukrainian former competitive ice dancer. With former partner Natalia Gudina, he is the 1996 World Junior bronze medalist.

Programs 
(with Gudina)

Competitive highlights 
(with Gudina)

References 

Ukrainian male ice dancers
Living people
1977 births
Sportspeople from Odesa